Lüneburger SK Hansa is a football club from the Lower Saxon Hanseatic town of Lüneburg in Northern Germany. The club was founded in spring 2008 as part of the planned merger of the football divisions of the two sports clubs Lüneburger SK and Lüneburger SV.

History 
The former Oberliga team, Lüneburger SK, got into financial difficulties after its relegation from Regional League North (Regionalliga Nord) in 2001, which eventually led in 2002 to the initiation of insolvency proceedings. To resolve the club's debts its president, Manfred Harder, looked for suitable partners. After three months of negotiations he announced in early 2008 with the committee of the district league team, Lüneburger SV, the foundation of a new club, FC Hansa Lüneburg.

In the 2008–09 season the new club merged the football divisions of both clubs fully. FC Hansa Lüneburg took over the position held by Lüneburger SK in the Lower Saxony League (Niedersachsenliga) and its right to participate in the first main round of the 2008–09 DFB-Pokal, playing VfB Stuttgart (result 0–5). In the Lower Saxony League the club achieved 4th place in its first season.

In the 2013–14 season of the Niedersachsenliga, Lüneburg SK Hansa was the champion and have thus played since the 2014–15 season again in the 4th league, the Regionalliga Nord. In the 2017–18 season, LSK again played in the DFB-Pokal. The club were beaten in the first main round, with a 1–3 defeat against Bundesliga side Mainz 05, however midfielder Felix Vobejda scored the first goal for the club in the cup's history.

The first team has been using the Heinrich-Langeloh-Platz (shared with TSV Bardowick) since 2014, after Wilschenbruch stadium was demolished following its sale to make way for new residential homes.

Current squad

Honours 
The club's honours:
 Niedersachsenliga
 Champions: 2014

Name 
Team manager, Christos Dovas, and the president of Lüneburger SK, Manfred Harder, chose the name of the newly founded football club, FC Hansa Lüneburg. The name was supposed to reflect Lüneburg's past as a member of the Hanseatic League – since 2007 Lüneburg has once again been officially recognised as a Hanseatic town.
After the first critical comments about the club name were made, especially its similarity to the name of F.C. Hansa Rostock, in February 2008 a local paper, Landeszeitung für die Lüneburger Heide, ran a poll in which over 700 readers took part. 59% voted against the name FC Hansa, 33% for and 8% had no view either way.

On 1 July 2011, the club was officially renamed Lüneburger SK Hansa.

References

External links 
 
Photo gallery

Luneburg
Luneburg, Hansa
Lüneburg
Association football clubs established in 2008
2008 establishments in Germany